Istanbul Military Museum is dedicated to one thousand years of Turkish military history. It is one of the leading museums of its kind in the world. The museum is open to the public everyday except Mondays and Tuesdays.

The museum initially opened in Saint Irene Church. Later in 1950, it was moved to the First Army Headquarters building in Cumhuriyet Caddesi, Harbiye, not far from Taksim Square in Istanbul. Harbiye district (an Ottoman derivation from the Arabic word harb for warfare) was the site of the Ottoman imperial military academy, the empire's "West Point" or "Sandhurst" and is still an important military installation. A fine collection of historical weapons, uniforms and tools of various periods of the army are on display. The highlights are the magnificent campaign tents and standards. Outside the museum, interesting Ottoman cannons and mortars, a rail gun, aircraft, helicopters are on display.

The military museum and culture center was renovated and reopened at its present building in 1993 with a very successful and contemporary exhibition concept. Today in 22 rooms about nine thousand pieces from the Ottoman era through World War I are exhibited, out of a total collection of fifty thousand objects. It holds striking historical treasures such as the chain that the Byzantines stretched across the mouth of the Golden Horn to keep out the Mehmed II's navy in 1453 during the siege of Constantinople. The east wing of the museum is used for temporary exhibitions, meetings and similar activities. On the ground floor, the display of bows and arrows in the first room is followed by sections containing the weapons and other regalia of the cavalry, curved daggers and lancets carried by foot soldiers in the 15th century, 17th century copper head armor for horses and Ottoman shields carried by the janissaries, and sections devoted to Selim I, Mehmed II, the conquest of Istanbul, weaponry from the early Islamic, Iranian, Caucasian, European and Turkish periods. This floor also houses a unique collection of helmets and armor, as well as the sections allocated to firearms and great field tents used by sultans on their campaigns. On the upper floor there are rooms where objects from World War I, the Battle of Gallipoli, and the Turkish War of Independence, and uniforms from more recent times are displayed. There is also a room which is dedicated to Atatürk, who studied in the building when it was a military academy between 1899-1905.

The Janissary Band "Mehter Takımı", world’s oldest military band gives concerts of march music in traditional uniforms each afternoon. The Ottomans was the first to use musicians in military campaigns and to integrate music into the life and work of the army. After a town had been conquered, the Mehter preceded the conquering Ottoman commander on a procession through the town, playing slow-cadence marches in exotic minor modes. The boom of kettledrums, invented by the Mehter, the wail of oboes and clash of cymbals, (another Turkish invention) was meant to glorify the conquest and impress upon the populace that they were now part of an entirely different civilization.

In 1957, the museum was reorganized by General Ahmet Hulki Saral.

Gallery

References

External links 

Pictures of hundreds of objects in the museum

Military Museum
Military and war museums in Turkey
Museums established in 1950
Military Museum
Şişli
1950 establishments in Turkey
Turkish Land Forces